Tonica pharmacis is a moth in the family Depressariidae. It was described by Alexey Diakonoff in 1966. It is found on Sumatra.

References

Moths described in 1966
Tonica